Nonsense is a 2018 Indian Malayalam-language sports thriller film co-written and directed by M. C. Jithin and produced by Johny Sagariga. It features Rinosh George in the lead role, who also composed and sang the film's original songs. The movie has many bicycle stunt scenes. Nonsense is the first Indian film to feature BMX bicycle sport.

Plot
Arun, a teenager was orphaned at a young age and is taken care by his grandfather. Though, Arun is backward at studies in his school, He likes thinking practical. However, his teachers misunderstands that he cannot study. Especially, his physics teacher Sheena calls him a 'nonsense'. One morning, Arun had befriended an auto driver named Santhosh, after he dropped him to school.

One day, the students of his school are asked to leave because of bandh. While, leaving Sheena asks her colleague, Lakshmi to take care of her daughter, Jesna while she is away. Lakshmi leaves Jesna in the beauty parlour reception. Bored, Jesna sneaks out and finds Arun. Jesna recognises him and befriends him. However, a car hits Jesna. Alarmed, Arun takes her to the hospital with the help of Santhosh. 

Things take a turn when the doctor reveals that Jesna has lost a lot of blood and Jesna needs a unit of A− Negative blood. Arun and Santhosh struggles to search anyone who has A− Negative blood. Meanwhile, Lakshmi has discovered what happened and rushes to the hospital after calling Sheena. Finally, Santhosh reveals that he has A− Negative blood type and never said about it as he was scared. After returning to hospital Santhosh donates his blood. Jesna is cured.

Back in school, Sheena reprimands Arun for not completing his homeworks. Arun agrees to complete his homework. Before leaving, Sheena thanks Arun for saving her daughter's life. Lakshmi asks Sheena about Jesna to which Sheena replies that Jesna is all ok. The film ends with the class leader of Arun's class, writing on the board, a quote by Dr APJ Abdul Kalam: 'The best brains of the world may be found on the last benches of the classroom' indicating Arun, who was in last bench of his class.

Cast 

Rinosh George as Arun
Febia V. Mathew as Head Girl and also a Classmate
Sreenath Babu as Ajesh Mathew
Shruthi Ramachandran as Sheena Miss 
Vinay Forrt as Santhosh (Auto Driver)
Kalabhavan Shajohn as PT Sir
Urmila Unni as Principal
Baby Alma as Jesna Nissam
Sanju Sivram as Nissam (Sheena Miss Husband)
Sree Gopika as Rose (Class Mate)
Fahim Safar
Balaji Sarma as Manoj
Anil Nedumagad as Sudhy
Lalu Alex as Surgeon Doctor
Divya Prabha as Nurse 
Abu Valyamkulam
Santhakumari as K P Annamma
Gilu Joseph as Biology Miss
 Sarjano Khalid
Sreeja as Lekshmi Miss
Veena as Library Miss
Sunaina as Malayalam Miss
Annul Pale as himself (Cameo appearance)

Production

New director MC Jithin, who was an associate of Abrid Shine, wanted to cast Rinosh George, a DJ and musician, in the lead role. The two had worked together on Rinosh's first music video.  He received many rejections from production houses based on the title (Nonsense) and the unknown cast. The project was approved by Johny Sagarika Production House, which produced many hit Malayalam movies, after Rinosh George gained popularity for his music video "I'm A Mallu".

This is the first film in India to feature BMX cycling sport. The movie has many stunt scenes, leading the makers to call it a "sports thriller."

Soundtrack
Beside starring, Rinosh George also composed and sang the film's original songs. The soundtracks consists of three songs written by Vinayak Sasikumar, the songs were released by the music label Johny Sagariga on 17 October 2018. The film's score was composed by Vishnu Shyam.

Release
The film was released on 12 October 2018.

Critical reception
The Times of India rated 3 out of 5 stars, calling it "an immensely watchable film, made by a director with promise (MC Jithin, who identifies himself as MC in the titles), with dialogues by a writer with an impeccable sense of humour."

References

External links
 
 
 

2010s Malayalam-language films
Cycling films
Indian sports films
Films about sportspeople
2010s high school films
Films about teacher–student relationships